The Challoner Club was the only London gentlemen's club that restricted membership to practising Catholics. It was founded in 1949 and closed around 1997.

It was based at 59 Pont Street in Knightsbridge, and hosted the library of the Irish Genealogical Research Society.

References

1949 establishments in England
1997 disestablishments in England
Catholic organizations
Knightsbridge
Gentlemen's clubs in London